Mendero College is a new private college offering Bachelor of Science in Nursing at Barangay Tiguma, Pagadian City, Mindanao, in the Philippines. It was founded in June 2008. The base hospital of the college is Pagadian City Medical Center or Mendero Hospital (also referred to by the acronym PCMC).

See also
List of universities and colleges in the Philippines

References

External links
mypagadian.com
pagadian.org

Universities and colleges in Zamboanga del Sur
Schools in Pagadian